Vincent J. McBrierty is an Irish academician, author, educator, physicist, and researcher.

Career
An alumnus of St. Mary's Christian Brothers' Grammar School, Belfast, he attended Queen's University Belfast from which he obtained a BSc(Hons) in Physics.  He then undertook graduate research at Middlesex Hospital Medical School, University of London from which he obtained a PhD on the subject of nitrogen oxides in 1964.

In 1976, he was appointed to Trinity College Dublin where he remained for his whole academic career rising to the position of Professor of Physics. He was awarded a ScD by the College in 1980 and the title of Fellow Emeritus on his retirement. McBrierty was the first Catholic on the academic staff of the Department of Physics in Trinity College and served as a Professor, Dean, and Bursar at the College.

Research
McBrierty specializes in Irrigation and Water Management and Soil and Environmental sciences.

Publications
McBrierty, V.J., & O'Hanlon, G. The World in Crisis: the Response of the Church, The Furrow, Vol. 63, No. 9 (September 2012), pp. 391–400.

Awards
  Knight of the Sacred Military Constantinian Order of Saint George
 Member, Royal Irish Academy (1983)

References

External links
Profile, holysepulchre.ie; accessed 13 November 2016.

People educated at St. Mary's Christian Brothers' Grammar School, Belfast
Academics of Trinity College Dublin
Irish physicists
Living people
Alumni of Trinity College Dublin
Scientists from Belfast
Place of birth missing (living people)
Year of birth missing (living people)